Bari Behen is a 1949 Hindi drama film directed, written and produced by D. D. Kashyap, starring Suraiya, Rehman, Ullhas and Pran. The film was remade in Sinhalese as Sujatha (1953).

Plot
Shyama (Suraiya) gets a job as a servant so she can pay for her younger sister, Kiran's (Geeta Bali) education in the city. Kiran, though, is in love with a rogue, Ajit (Pran). Ajit makes Kiran splurge all the money Shyama sends her on them. Meanwhile, Shyama meets and falls in love with Shyam (Rehman), the son of the family she works for and who is a doctor who wants to treat the poor. With both of being ill-treated by the woman of the house, who is Shyam's step-mother, they decide to elope. However, Kiran comes to her, abandoned and pregnant. Shyama goes along with her without informing Shyam in order to find Ajit. They find Ajit, but he escapes from them. The two sisters then relocate to another town. Kiran has the child, Shyama works in another house, where in order to get Kiran settled with the young man of the house and to prove her to be without blemish, she takes it upon herself to claim to be the mother of the child. This causes further complications with Shyam, who has managed to trace her out and now believes that she has been unfaithful to him. Wallowing in grief, he falls ill. Finally, with the help of a kindly army colonel, also Ajit's uncle (Ulhas), all's well that ends well, with a repentant Ajit marrying Kiran and Shyama reunited with Shyam.

Cast
 Suraiya as Shyama
 Rehman as Shyam
 Ullhas as Colonel
 Geeta Bali as Kiran
 Gulab
 Pran as Jeetu /Ajit
 Roop Kamal
 Niranjan Sharma as Amar Nath
 Baij Sharma
 Shanti Madhok
 Ram Avtar as Seth Amrit Lal
 Amar Kumar
 Gyani Sarang
 Mrs. Paul
 Papoo
 Baby Tabassum as Munni

Soundtrack

Music composed by Husnlal Bhagatram and lyrics by Rajendra Krishan & Qamar Jalalabadi.

References

External links 
 

1949 films
1940s Hindi-language films
Hindi films remade in other languages
Indian black-and-white films
Indian drama films
1949 drama films
Films scored by Husnlal Bhagatram
Hindi-language drama films